Gabe York (born August 2, 1993) is an American professional basketball player for the Fort Wayne Mad Ants of the NBA G League. He played college basketball for the Arizona Wildcats, earning second-team all-conference honors in the Pac-12 as a senior in 2015–16.

High school career
York attended Orange Lutheran High School in Orange, California. He averaged 24.9 points, 4.8 rebounds, 2.7 assists, and 2.3 steals per game as a senior where he became the all-time leading scorer of the school.  He was rated as the No. 46 overall prospect and No. 11 shooting guard in the class of 2012 by Rivals.com and a scout grade of 93 by ESPN. He signed to Arizona on July 10, 2011.

College career
York played limited minutes his freshman season at Arizona and only appeared in 15 games while backing up former NBA player Nick Johnson. During his sophomore season, York saw his playing time increase as he appeared in all 38 games and helped the Wildcats reach their second Elite Eight appearance. His playing time continued to increase in his junior and senior years.

College statistics

|-
| style="text-align:left;"| 2012–13
| style="text-align:left;"| Arizona
| 15 || 0 || 5.8 || .406 || .348 || .500 || 0.3 || 0.6 || 0.1 || 0.0 || 2.4
|-
| style="text-align:left;"| 2013–14
| style="text-align:left;"| Arizona
| 38 || 12 || 21.8 || .371 || .385 || .673 || 2.2 || 1.6 || 0.5 || 0.1 || 6.7
|-
| style="text-align:left;"| 2014–15
| style="text-align:left;"| Arizona
| 37 || 13 || 23.1 || .440 || .400 || .811 || 2.1 || 1.2 || 0.6 || 0.4 || 9.2
|-
| style="text-align:left;"| 2015–16
| style="text-align:left;"| Arizona
| 34 || 34 || 33.3 || .422 || .421 || .756 || 3.2 || 2.2 || 0.9 || 0.3 || 15.0
|-
|colspan=2 style="text-align:center;"| Career
| 124 || 59 || 23.4 || .414 || .402 || .750 || 2.2 || 1.5 || 0.6 || 0.2 || 9.2

Professional career

Guerino Vanoli Basket (2016)
After going undrafted in the 2016 NBA Draft, York joined the Charlotte Hornets for the 2016 NBA Summer League. On July 22, 2016, York signed with Vanoli Cremona of the Italian Serie A. On November 15, 2016, he parted ways with Cremona after averaging 4.3 points and 2.5 rebounds in 6 games.

Erie BayHawks (2016–2017)
Six days after leaving Vanoli Cremona, he was acquired by the Erie BayHawks of the NBA Development League. On December 15, York scored 38 points, two rebounds, four assists and four steals in 38 minutes, including 10 triples in a 118–99 Erie win over the Los Angeles D-Fenders.

Medi Bayreuth (2017–2018)
York joined the Los Angeles Lakers for the 2017 NBA Summer League. On July 31, 2017, York signed with German club Medi Bayreuth. Appearing in 37 games (with 37 starts) of the 2017-18 Basketball Bundesliga season, York averaged a team-high 14.2 points per contest, hitting 93 of his 258 three-pointers.

Lakeland Magic (2018–2019)
On September 5, 2018, York signed with the Orlando Magic. On September 27, 2018, York was waived by the Magic. On October 23, 2018, York was included in the training camp roster of the Lakeland Magic.

AEK Athens (2019)
On April 12, 2019, York signed a contract with the Greek Basket League club AEK Athens, which kept him at the club until the end of the 2018-19 Greek Basket League season.

Hapoel Tel Aviv (2020–2021)
On November 30, 2020, he signed with Hapoel Tel Aviv of the Israeli Premier League. However, he was released on March 18, 2021.

Indiana Pacers / Fort Wayne Mad Ants (2021–present)
On October 23, 2021, York was selected third overall in the 2021 NBA G League draft by the Fort Wayne Mad Ants.

On April 7, 2022, York signed a two-way contract with the Indiana Pacers. On April 9, 2022, York made his NBA debut scoring 7 points and two assists, winning the team's game ball.

On September 16, 2022, York re-signed with the Indiana Pacers.

On October 24, 2022, York rejoined the Fort Wayne Mad Ants roster for training camp. He was named to the G League's inaugural Next Up Game for the 2022–23 season.

Career statistics

NBA

|-
| style="text-align:left;"| 
| style="text-align:left;"| Indiana
| 2 || 0 || 10.5 || .286 || .167 || .600 || 1.0 || 2.0 || 1.0 || .5 || 4.0
|- class="sortbottom"
| style="text-align:center;" colspan="2"| Career
| 2 || 0 || 10.5 || .286 || .167 || .600 || 1.0 || 2.0 || 1.0 || .5 || 4.0

Basketball Champions League

|-
| style="text-align:left;" | 2017–18
| style="text-align:left;" | Bayreuth
| 18 || 30.5 || .455 || .435 || .844 || 4.0 || 2.4 || 1.2 || 0.0 || 16.9
|}

Domestic leagues

References

External links
 Arizona Wildcats bio

1993 births
Living people
American expatriate basketball people in Germany
American expatriate basketball people in Greece
American expatriate basketball people in Italy
American men's basketball players
Arizona Wildcats men's basketball players
Basketball players from California
Erie BayHawks (2008–2017) players
Fort Wayne Mad Ants players
Hapoel Tel Aviv B.C. players
Indiana Pacers players
Lakeland Magic players
Lega Basket Serie A players
Medi Bayreuth players
Point guards
SIG Basket players
Sportspeople from West Covina, California
Undrafted National Basketball Association players
Vanoli Cremona players